Neofetch is a system information tool written in the Bash shell scripting language. On the left side is always a logo of the distribution, rendered in ASCII art. Unlike a system monitor, the tool only features a static display of the computer's basic hardware and software configurations and their versions, typically operating system, the host (namely the technical name of the machine), uptime, package managers, the shell, display resolution, desktop environment, window manager, themes and icons, the computer terminal, CPU, GPU, and RAM. Neofetch can also display images on the terminal with w3m-img in place of the ASCII logo art.   

Neofetch is available for any operating system that supports Bash shell, such as Linux, macOS, BSD, Microsoft Windows, iOS, Android, GNU Hurd, Haiku, IRIX, MINIX, Solaris.

Example screenshots

Other implementations 
 afetch, written in ANSI C
 CoalFetch, a one-liner program in Java
 efetch, written in C++
 gfetch, written in rc scripting language
 hfetch, written in Bash
 nerdfetch, fetch script using Nerd Fonts
 nextfetch, written in Go
 Pasfetch, written in Pascal
 perlfetch, written in Perl
 pfetch, written in Bourne scripting language
 rfetch, written in Rust
 swef, written in Lua
 ufetch, single script for each platform
 winfetch, written in PowerShell scripting language

References

External links
 A subreddit dedicated to Fetches
 List of Fetches

Console applications 
Cross-platform free software